Frank Gill (10 December 1908 – 23 June 1970) was an Australian rules footballer who played with Carlton in the VFL. He is a member of the Carlton Hall of Fame.

Gill was a full back and was one of the longest kickers of the ball in his time. He represented Victoria in 1932 and captained Carlton the following season. In 1939 he won Carlton's best and fairest and was a premiership player the previous season.

References

External links

Blueseum profile

1908 births
Australian rules footballers from Victoria (Australia)
Carlton Football Club players
Carlton Football Club Premiership players
John Nicholls Medal winners
Nhill Football Club players
1970 deaths
One-time VFL/AFL Premiership players